Helops rossii is a species of darkling beetles (insects belonging to the family Tenebrionidae) in the subfamily Tenebrioninae.

Description

Body is metallic blue-black in color.
These beetles can be found from January to December.

Distribution
This species is present in Austria, Croatia, Italy and Montenegro.

References

Tenebrioninae
Beetles of Europe
Beetles described in 1817